Kerplunk may refer to:

 Kerplunk (album), an album by Green Day
 KerPlunk (game), a game of physical skill involving marbles and rods in a cylinder
 KerPlunk, a nickname given to the sculpture B of the Bang
 Kerplunk experiment, a famous experiment of psychology conducted by John Watson
 A tune by jazz trumpeter Donald Byrd on the 1956 Jackie McClean album Lights Out!

See also
 Onomatopoeia, a word or phrase that both names and imitates a sound